Late Antiquity is a historiographical term for the historical period from c. 200 AD to c. 700 AD, which marks the transition from Classical Antiquity to the Middle Ages. Precise boundaries for the period are a matter of debate, but historian Peter Brown proposed a period between the 2nd and 8th centuries. While generally, it can be thought of as from the end of the Roman Empire's Crisis of the Third Century (c. 235–284) to the re-organization of the Eastern Roman Empire under Heraclius and the Muslim conquests in the mid-7th century, for the purposes of this page it will be considered the period 200 to 700 AD.

This list's the main types state that existed in Africa, Americas, Central Asia, East Asia, Europe, Eurasian Steppe, South Asia, and West Asia.

Political entities

See also 

 List of Copper Age states (c. 5000–3300 BC)
 List of Bronze Age states (c. 3300–1200 BC)
 List of Iron Age states (c. 1200–600 BC)
 List of Classical Age states (c. 600 BC–200 AD)
 List of states during the Middle Ages (c. 700–1500)
 List of former sovereign states
 List of states in the 3rd century
 List of states in the 4th century
 List of states in the 5th century
 List of states in the 6th century
 List of states in the 7th century
List of ancient great powers
List of medieval great powers
List of modern great powers
List of largest empires
Lists of state leaders by year
Ancient Africa
Ancient Americas
History of Central Asia
Ancient China
History of East Asia
Ancient Europe
History of India
Ancient Iran
Ancient Middle East
Ancient Near East
History of South Asia

References

 States
Late Antiquity
States and territories established in the 1st millennium